Cimcik erişte or Cimcik makarna is a traditional pasta made in Turkey. They are made from flour, eggs and salt. They resemble a butterfly and are similar to farfalle.

References

Turkish cuisine
Turkish pasta
Types of pasta